The Mount Washington Branch of the Carnegie Library of Pittsburgh located at 315 Grandview Avenue in the Mount Washington neighborhood of Pittsburgh, Pennsylvania, was built in 1900.  It was designed by the architectural firm Alden & Harlow,  and it was added to the List of City of Pittsburgh historic designations on July 28, 2004 and the List of Pittsburgh History and Landmarks Foundation Historic Landmarks in 1989.

The branch re-opened in 2021 following extensive renovations and expansion.

Gallery

References

Libraries in Pittsburgh
Library buildings completed in 1900
Carnegie libraries in Pennsylvania